() is a United States public law that would take specified federal land in El Dorado County, California, into trust for the Shingle Springs Band of Miwok Indians. The United States Secretary of the Interior would be responsible for carrying this out.

The bill passed both the United States House of Representatives and the United States Senate during the 113th United States Congress. President Barack Obama signed into law on July 16, 2014, making it .

Background
The United States Department of the Interior provided the following background information about the situation when it testified about the bill before the Subcommittee on Indian and Alaska Native Affairs of the House Natural Resources Committee: "On December 16, 1916, the Secretary of the Interior purchased the 160-acre Shingle Springs Rancheria east of Sacramento in El Dorado County, California at the request of the Sacramento-Verona Band of Miwok Indians. Today's members of the Shingle Springs Rancheria are descendants of the Miwok and Maidu Indians who once lived in this region. Currently, there are approximately 500 enrolled members of the Tribe, with about 140 living on the Rancheria.The tribe has expressed an interest in expanding the Rancheria by adding adjacent BLM-managed lands for improved access and additional residential housing for the tribe."

Provisions of the bill
This summary is based largely on the summary provided by the Congressional Research Service, a public domain source.

H.R. 2388 would take specified federal land in El Dorado County, California, into trust for the Shingle Springs Band of Miwok Indians.

The bill would describe that land as the approximately 40.852 acres of federal land under the administrative jurisdiction of the Bureau of Land Management (BLM) identified as "Conveyance boundary" on the map titled "Shingle Springs Land Conveyance/Draft" and dated June 7, 2012, including improvements and appurtenances thereto.

The bill would prohibit class II and III gaming on such lands.

Congressional Budget Office report
This summary is based largely on the summary provided by the Congressional Budget Office, as ordered reported by the Senate Committee on Indian Affairs on May 21, 2014. This is a public domain source.

H.R. 2388 would take about 40 acres of federal land in El Dorado County, California, into trust for the benefit of the Shingle Springs Band of Miwok Indians. Based on information provided by the United States Department of the Interior, the Congressional Budget Office (CBO) estimates that implementing H.R. 2388 would have no significant effect on the federal budget because the cost of administering the lands would not change significantly. Enacting H.R. 2388 would not affect direct spending or revenues; therefore, pay-as-you-go procedures do not apply.

H.R. 2388 contains no intergovernmental or private-sector mandates as defined in the Unfunded Mandates Reform Act.

On August 29, 2013, CBO transmitted a cost estimate for H.R. 2388 as ordered reported by the House Committee on Natural Resources on July 31, 2013. The two versions of the legislation are similar, and the CBO cost estimates are the same.

Procedural history
H.R. 2388 was introduced into the United States House of Representatives on June 14, 2013 by Rep. Tom McClintock (R, CA-4). The bill was referred to the United States House Committee on Natural Resources, the United States House Natural Resources Subcommittee on Public Lands and Environmental Regulation, and the United States House Natural Resources Subcommittee on Indian and Alaska Native Affairs. The bill was reported (amended) alongside House Report 113-195. The House voted on December 3, 2013 to pass the bill in a voice vote.

The bill was received in the United States Senate on December 9, 2013 and referred to the United States Senate Committee on Indian Affairs. The Senate had a hearing about the bill on May 21, 2014. The Senate voted on June 26, 2014 to pass the bill by unanimous consent. President Barack Obama signed the bill into law on July 16, 2014.

Debate and discussion
The Department of the Interior supported the bill.

See also
List of bills in the 113th United States Congress
Native American gaming
Impact of Native American gaming
Indian Gaming Regulatory Act

References

External links

Library of Congress - Thomas H.R. 2388
beta.congress.gov H.R. 2388
GovTrack.us H.R. 2388
OpenCongress.org H.R. 2388
WashingtonWatch.com H.R. 2388
Congressional Budget Office's report on H.R. 2388
House Report 113-195 on H.R. 2388

United States federal Native American legislation
Acts of the 113th United States Congress